Karlo Bilić (born 6 September 1993) is a Croatian professional footballer who plays as a defender for Slovenian PrvaLiga club Koper.

Club career

Železiarne Podbrezová
Bilić made his professional debut for Železiarne Podbrezová against Spartak Trnava on 29 July 2017.

Šibenik
On 14 February 2019, Bilić signed with Šibenik.

Honours
Šibenik
 Croatian Second League: 2019–20

References

External links
 
 Futbalnet profile

1993 births
Living people
Footballers from Split, Croatia
Association football central defenders
Croatian footballers
NK Dugopolje players
FK Slavija Sarajevo players
FC VSS Košice players
FK Železiarne Podbrezová players
HNK Šibenik players
FC Koper players
First Football League (Croatia) players
Premier League of Bosnia and Herzegovina players
2. Liga (Slovakia) players
Slovak Super Liga players
Croatian Football League players
Slovenian PrvaLiga players
Croatian expatriate footballers
Expatriate footballers in Bosnia and Herzegovina
Expatriate footballers in Slovakia
Expatriate footballers in Slovenia
Croatian expatriate sportspeople in Bosnia and Herzegovina
Croatian expatriate sportspeople in Slovakia
Croatian expatriate sportspeople in Slovenia